Scotland's Climate Assembly is a citizens' assembly held from 2020 - 2022 to deliberate how Scotland should tackle the climate crisis in an effective and fair way.

The establishment of a citizens’ assembly with a mandate to make climate recommendations to the Scottish Government was embedded in a 2019 amendment to the Climate Change (Scotland) Act 2009.

The assembly was formed of over 100 members broadly representative of Scotland in terms of age, gender, household income, ethnicity, geography, rurality, disability, and attitude towards climate change.

References

Further reading 
Scotland's Climate Assembly: Recommendations for Action Report

Scotland's Climate Assembly Researxh Report: process, impact and assembly member experience

The Emotional Experience of Members of Scotland's Citizens' Assembly on Climate Change

External links 
Official website of Scotland's Climate Assembly
Official Scottish Government webpage for Climate Assembly Research Report
Official Website of the Children's Parliament

Climate change in Scotland
Scotland's Environmental and Rural Services
Assemblies in the United Kingdom